Fredrick John Forward (8 September 1899 – 1977) was a footballer who played in The Football League for Crystal Palace, Newport County, Portsmouth, Hull City. He also played for Bath City and Margate.

References

English footballers
Crystal Palace F.C. players
Newport County A.F.C. players
Portsmouth F.C. players
Hull City A.F.C. players
Bath City F.C. players
Margate F.C. players
English Football League players
1899 births
1977 deaths
Association football wingers
FA Cup Final players